Isangel is a town in Vanuatu.

Located on the island of Tanna, it is the provincial administrative capital of Tafea Province.

Population
The town has a population of about 1,200, most of them Melanesians; the major languages of the area are Lenakel language, and the national tongue Bislama, an English creole.

Populated places in Vanuatu
Tafea Province